Freddie Abuda (born October 8, 1969) is a Filipino former basketball player. He was drafted by Purefoods, then known Coney Island Ice Cream, in the 2nd round as the 14th overall pick. Abuda played eleven seasons in the PBA, most of them with the San Miguel Beermen.

Abuda gained the moniker The Scavenger as a large proportion of his points were the result of his scoring on a follow-up after rebounding a teammate's missed shot while playing in the Philippine Basketball Associations (PBA). He began his career as a reserve player for Purefoods and was later traded to San Miguel Beer where he developed into an important role player. His tough defensive and solid rebounding skills contributed to San Miguel Beer gaining multiple championships. He is currently serving as an assistant coach to the San Beda Red Lions of the NCAA Philippines and Barangay Ginebra San Miguel of the PBA.

References

External links
 Hoopedia Player Profile: Freddie Abuda
 Asia-Basket.com

1969 births
Living people
Basketball players from Eastern Samar
Filipino men's basketball coaches
Filipino men's basketball players
Magnolia Hotshots draft picks
Magnolia Hotshots players
Barangay Ginebra San Miguel coaches
Power forwards (basketball)
Powerade Tigers players
San Miguel Beermen players
UC Webmasters basketball players
Waray people
San Miguel Beermen coaches